Babia tetraspilota, the western babia, is a species of case-bearing leaf beetle in the family Chrysomelidae. It is found in Central America and North America.

Subspecies
These three subspecies belong to the species Babia tetraspilota:
 Babia tetraspilota tenuis Schaeffer, 1933
 Babia tetraspilota tetraspilota J. L. LeConte, 1858
 Babia tetraspilota texana Schaeffer, 1933

References

Further reading

 

Clytrini
Articles created by Qbugbot
Beetles described in 1858